Sebastian Balthasar (Cologne, Germany, 30 August 1996) is a German racing driver.

Career

Karting
Balthasar started his racing career in the 2009 karting season. He became third in the Rotax Max Challenge Germany. A year later he entered the Ciao Thomas Knopper Memorial, the ADAC Kart Championship, the German Junior Kart Championship and the 21° Trofeo Andrea Margutti, with a tenth place as his best result. He continued karting throughout 2011 and '12, again entering the German Junior Karts, besides racing in the DMV Kart Championship and the Euro Wintercup.

Formula racing
Balthasar made the switch to formula racing in 2012, when he entered the ADAC Formel Masters, as the teammate of Alessio Picariello, which he would race again in 2014. With a best result of 4th, he finished 13th in the championship. He then entered the 2012-13 MRF Challenge Formula 2000 Championship season, finishing 19th.

Things changed when he entered the 2013 German Formula Three season, finishing only 10th in the ATS Formel 3 Cup, but winning the ATS Formula 3 Trophy. Finally, in 2014 he is competing in FA1, part of Acceleration 2014.

Racing Record

Career Summary

Complete Formula Acceleration 1 results
(key) (Races in bold indicate pole position) (Races in italics indicate fastest lap)

Complete GP3 Series results
(key) (Races in bold indicate pole position) (Races in italics indicate fastest lap)

† Driver did not finish the race, but was classified as he completed over 90% of the race distance.

References

External links
  
 

1996 births
Living people
Sportspeople from Cologne
German racing drivers
German Formula Three Championship drivers
ADAC Formel Masters drivers
MRF Challenge Formula 2000 Championship drivers
German GP3 Series drivers

24H Series drivers
Hilmer Motorsport drivers
Performance Racing drivers
Lamborghini Super Trofeo drivers